Edward Harrington Jennings (February 18, 1937 – August 10, 2019) was a professor in finance and University President at University of Wyoming and The Ohio State University.

Career
Jennings holds a Bachelor of Science in industrial management from the University of North Carolina, an MBA from Case Western Reserve University, and a Ph.D. from the University of Michigan.

Faculty and administrative appointments include the University of Iowa and the University of Wyoming.

Tenure at Ohio State
Jennings was the 11th President of Ohio State University from September 1, 1981, to August 31, 1990, and also the acting (interim) president from July 1, 2002, until October 1, 2002, after Bill Kirwan left the office. While at Ohio State, Jennings was a professor of finance at the Fisher College of Business.  During his tenure, Jennings fired Ohio State's football coach Earle Bruce in 1987. Jennings is also the namesake of the Botany and Zoology Building, Jennings Hall, on the Columbus campus of Ohio State University, which was named after him in 2002.

Death
Jennings died at a Tampa, Florida hospital on August 10, 2019.

References

1937 births
2019 deaths
People from Minneapolis
Presidents of Ohio State University
University of Michigan alumni
Presidents of the University of Wyoming